Robinsons Cybergate, also known as Robinsons Cybergate Complex and Cybergate City, is a mixed-use development located along EDSA corner Pioneer Street in Mandaluyong, Metro Manila, Philippines. Owned by Robinsons Land Corporation, the development is anchored by four office buildings named Robinsons Cybergate Center Towers 1, 2, 3 and Robinsons Cybergate Plaza which has a Go Hotel.

The site is an economic zone, as declared by the Philippine Economic Zone Authority (PEZA). It sits on a 6-hectare site in close proximity to public transportation along EDSA and the Boni station of the MRT Line 3. The development is also home to the Office of the Vice President of the Philippines (OVP). The OVP moved to Cybergate Plaza in 2022, under the tenure of Sara Duterte.

There is also a Robinsons Cybergate in Cebu which started development in 2010. It is located in near Chung Hua in Osmeña Boulevard, Cebu City.

Structures

Office buildings 

 Robinsons Cybergate Center Tower 1
 Robinsons Cybergate Center Tower 2
 Robinsons Cybergate Center Tower 3
 Robinsons Cybergate Plaza

Residential buildings 
 Axis Residences
 Gateway Garden Ridge
 Gateway Garden Heights
 Go Hotel at Robinsons Cybergate Plaza
 One Gateway Place
 Gateway Regency

Shopping center 
 Forum Robinsons (closed; Robinsons Place Pioneer from 2004-2009)

Offices 
 Office of the Vice President of the Philippines
 Accenture
 ConnectOS
 Jobstreet Philippines
 Sitel
 Summit Media
 Teletech
 Vertiv
 Avalon Edunet Plus, Inc.

Retails 
 Starbucks
 Ready2GO
 Ministop
 Sandwich Guy
 Subway
 GOSalads
 Big Belly's
 Pan De Manila

See also 
 Robinsons Cyberscape
 Ortigas Center
 Mandaluyong

References 

Mixed-use developments in Metro Manila
Buildings and structures in Mandaluyong